Modern Locomotives Illustrated (formerly Locomotives Illustrated) is a British bi-monthly railway publication.

History
Locomotives Illustrated was founded in 1975 by Geoffrey Freeman Allen with the intention of creating a series of magazines, each issue dedicated to an individual class of British steam locomotive. By mid-2007, the magazine had covered almost every class of steam locomotive and the publishers, Locomotives Illustrated ended in early 2008 after 170 issues.

Ian Allan Publishing, were keen to revamp it. Ian Allan approached Colin J Marsden, former editor of Railways Illustrated, to take over the editorship and re-launch the magazine as Modern Locomotives Illustrated with a focus on modern diesel and electric locomotives and multiple units.  and Modern Locomotives Illustrated began from issue 171 in May 2008.

The publishers originally envisaged a run of 66 issues, which is expected to rise to closer to 80. The magazine is now published bi-monthly (on the fourth Thursday of the month) by Key Publishing.

Modern Locomotives Illustrated ran from issue 171 until issue 247 (Feb/March 2021). New title MLI Plus was published starting with No. 248 Issued in March 2021.

See also
List of rail transport-related periodicals

References

External links
Official website

1975 establishments in the United Kingdom
2008 establishments in the United Kingdom
Bi-monthly magazines published in the United Kingdom
Magazines established in 1975
Magazines established in 2008
Rail transport magazines published in the United Kingdom
Mass media in Lincolnshire